An outdoor sculpture of Thomas Jefferson by William Ordway Partridge is installed outside the School of Journalism on the Columbia University campus in Manhattan, New York, United States. It was modeled in plaster in 1901 and cast in bronze in 1914 by the New York-based foundry Roman Bronze Works.

See also
 1914 in art
 List of places named for Thomas Jefferson
 List of statues of Thomas Jefferson
 List of sculptures of presidents of the United States

References

1914 establishments in New York City
1914 sculptures
Bronze sculptures in Manhattan
Columbia University campus
Monuments and memorials in Manhattan
Outdoor sculptures in Manhattan
Statues in New York City
Columbia University